Bertha Vazquez is director of education for the Center for Inquiry, director of the Teacher Institute for Evolutionary Science (TIES), a program of the Center for Inquiry and a project of the Richard Dawkins Foundation for Reason and Science, and a middle school science teacher at the George Washington Carver Middle School in the Miami-Dade County Public Schools. She also manages the educational aspects of Science Saves and Young Skeptics, two other CFI programs.

Vazquez was appointed a Committee for Skeptical Inquiry fellow in 2020.

Early life and education
At age 18, Vazquez read The Selfish Gene and became a self-described fan of Richard Dawkins. She went on to obtain an undergraduate degree in biology from the University of Miami and a masters in science education from Florida International University.

Career
In 1989, served as a exhibit guide at the Phillip and Patricia Frost Museum of Science in Coconut Grove, Florida. That same year, she began her teaching career in Albi, France.

In 1990, Vazquez began teaching in Miami-Dade County Public Schools. She has taught sixth grade integrated science, seventh grade integrated science, Earth and space science, physical science, and biology. She has also taught French in Miami-Dade County Public Schools. Vazquez's main teaching interest has been in environmental education, and she encouraged her fellow teachers even in non-scientific subjects to incorporate climate change education in their curricula. Her efforts were recognized with the Charles C. Bartlett Award from the National Environmental Education Foundation in 2009.

Vazquez feels passionate about middle-school students learning about climate change especially as she teaches in Florida where they are "seeing the dramatic impacts of a warming planet". She devotes two weeks a year to climate change, assigning her students to not only learn about it, but to seek out and understand why some people don't believe it is caused by humans.

She also worked for the National Board for Professional Teaching Standards (NBPTS) from 2001 to 2009 as a Certification Council Member, Scoring Director, Science Portfolio Trainer, faculty member for the Development of National Mentoring Standards, Renewal Document Development team member, and portfolio development team member.

TIES 

In 2013, she met Dawkins at the University of Miami and discussed evolution education with him. This and her belief that teachers learn the most from each other inspired her to conduct workshops on evolution for her fellow teachers.

Dawkins followed up with a visit to Vazquez's school in 2014 to speak to teachers from the Miami-Dade County school district. This encounter along with the encouragement of Dawkins and Robyn Blumner led to the beginnings, in 2015, of the Teacher Institute for Evolutionary Science. Vazquez sees TIES as not only about evolution education but also about empowering teachers to be leaders in their educational communities. Since its inception, TIES has presented over 300 teacher professional development workshops in all 50 states.

Publications 
The book, On Teaching Evolution, was published in December 2021. Written by members of the Teacher Institute for Evolutionary Science who have tackled the topic of evolution in their classroom for decades, On Teaching Evolution offers practical advice and sample lesson plans for fellow science teachers. 
In June 2022, Bertha Vazquez translated the book, Breve Historia de 4 Mil Millones de Años: Entendiendo a Darwin, by Maria Jinich.
Vazquez, Bertha & Landorf, Hilary & Simons-Lane, L. (2016). Next Door to Old Smokey: Engaging in Scientific Measurements and Public Action. Middle Level Learning. January/February 2016. 12–16.
Vazquez, Bertha (2017) Helping Teachers Teach Evolution in the United States, Skeptical Inquirer Volume 41.3, May/June 2016
Vazquez, Bertha (17 July 2017). "A state-by-state comparison of middle school science standards on evolution in the United States" Evolution: Education and Outreach. 10 (5)

References

External links 
 The Teacher Institute for Evolutionary Science
 Skeptical Inquirer column

20th-century women educators
21st-century American women educators
21st-century American educators
Science teachers
American educators
Educators from Florida
Schoolteachers from Florida
Hispanic and Latino American teachers
University of Miami alumni